Edward G. Robinson (born Emanuel Goldenberg; December 12, 1893January 26, 1973) was a Romanian-American actor of stage and screen, who was popular during the Hollywood's Golden Age. He appeared in 30 Broadway plays and more than 100 films during a 50-year career and is best remembered for his tough-guy roles as gangsters in such films as Little Caesar and Key Largo. During his career, Robinson received the Cannes Film Festival Award for Best Actor for his performance in House of Strangers.

During the 1930s and 1940s, he was an outspoken public critic of fascism and Nazism, which were growing in strength in Europe in the years which led up to World War II. His activism included contributing over $250,000 to more than 850 organizations which were involved in war relief, along with contributions to cultural, educational and religious groups. During the 1950s, he was called to testify in front of the House Un-American Activities Committee during the Red Scare, but he was cleared of any deliberate Communist involvement when he claimed that he was "duped" by several people whom he named (including screenwriter Dalton Trumbo, according to the official Congressional record, "Communist infiltration of the Hollywood motion-picture industry"). As a result of being investigated, he found himself on Hollywood's graylist, people who were on the Hollywood blacklist maintained by the major studios, but could find work at minor film studios on what was called Poverty Row.

Robinson's roles included an insurance investigator in the film noir Double Indemnity, Dathan (the adversary of Moses) in The Ten Commandments, and his final performance in the science-fiction story Soylent Green. Robinson received an Academy Honorary Award for his work in the film industry, which was awarded two months after he died in 1973. He is ranked number 24 in the American Film Institute's list of the 25 greatest male stars of Classic American cinema. Multiple film critics and media outlets have cited him as one of the best actors never to have received an Academy Award nomination.

Early years and education
Robinson's original name was Menashe Goldenberg. He was born into a Yiddish-speaking Romanian Jewish family in Bucharest, the son of Sarah (née Guttman) and Yeshaya Moyshe Goldenberg (later called Morris in the US), a builder.

According to the New York Times, one of his brothers was attacked by an anti-semitic gang during a "schoolboy pogrom."  In the wake of that violence, the family decided to emigrate to the United States. Robinson arrived in New York City on February 21, 1904. "At Ellis Island I was born again," he wrote. "Life for me began when I was 10 years old." In America, he assumed the name of Emanuel. He grew up on the Lower East Side, and had his Bar Mitzvah at First Roumanian-American Congregation. He attended Townsend Harris High School and then the City College of New York, planning to become a criminal attorney. An interest in acting and performing in front of people led to him winning an American Academy of Dramatic Arts scholarship, after which he changed his name to Edward G. Robinson (the G. standing for his original surname).

He served in the United States Navy during World War I, but was never sent overseas.

Career

Theatre
In 1915, Robinson made his Broadway debut in Roi Cooper Megrue's "Under Fire".  He made his film debut in Arms and the Woman (1916).

In 1923, he made his named debut as E.G. Robinson in the silent film, The Bright Shawl.

The Racket
He played a snarling gangster in the 1927 Broadway police/crime drama The Racket, which led to his being cast in similar film roles, beginning with The Hole in the Wall (1929) with Claudette Colbert for Paramount.

One of many actors who saw their careers flourish rather than falter in the new sound film era, he made only three films prior to 1930, but left his stage career that year and made 14 films between 1930 and 1932.

Robinson went to Universal for Night Ride (1930) and MGM for A Lady to Love (1930) directed by Victor Sjöström. At Universal he was in Outside the Law and East Is West (both 1930), then he did The Widow from Chicago (1931) at First National.

Little Caesar
At this point, Robinson was becoming an established film actor. What began his rise to stardom was an acclaimed performance as the gangster Caesar Enrico "Rico" Bandello in Little Caesar (1931) at Warner Bros.

Robinson signed a long-term contract with Warners Bros., casting him in another gangster film, Smart Money (1931), his only movie with James Cagney. He was reunited with Mervyn LeRoy, director of Little Caesar, in Five Star Final (1931), playing a journalist, and played a Tong gangster in The Hatchet Man (1932).

Robinson made a third film with LeRoy, Two Seconds (1932) then did a melodrama directed by Howard Hawks, Tiger Shark (1932).

Warners tried him in a biopic, Silver Dollar (1932), where Robinson played Horace Tabor, a comedy, The Little Giant (1933) and a romance, I Loved a Woman (1933).

Robinson was then in Dark Hazard (1934), and The Man with Two Faces (1934).

He went to Columbia for The Whole Town's Talking (1935), a comedy directed by John Ford. Sam Goldwyn borrowed him for Barbary Coast (1935), again directed by Hawks.

Back at Warners he did Bullets or Ballots (1936) then he went to Britain for Thunder in the City (1937). He made Kid Galahad (1937) with Bette Davis and Humphrey Bogart. MGM borrowed him for The Last Gangster (1937) then he did a comedy A Slight Case of Murder (1938). Again with Bogart in a supporting role, he was in The Amazing Dr. Clitterhouse (1938) then he was borrowed by Columbia for I Am the Law (1938).

World War II
At the time World War II broke out in Europe, he played an FBI agent in Confessions of a Nazi Spy (1939), the first American film which portrayed Nazism as a threat to the United States.

He volunteered for military service in June 1942 but was disqualified due to his age which was 48, although he became an active and vocal critic of fascism and Nazism during that period.

MGM borrowed him for Blackmail, (1939). Then to avoid being typecast he played the biomedical scientist and Nobel laureate Paul Ehrlich in Dr. Ehrlich's Magic Bullet (1940) and played Paul Julius Reuter in A Dispatch from Reuter's (1940).  Both films were biographies of prominent Jewish public figures.  In between, he and Bogart starred in Brother Orchid (1940).

Robinson was teamed up with John Garfield in The Sea Wolf (1941) and George Raft in Manpower (1941). He went to MGM for Unholy Partners (1942) and made a comedy Larceny, Inc. (1942).

Post-Warner Bros.
Robinson was one of several stars in Tales of Manhattan (1942) and Flesh and Fantasy (1943).

He did war films: Destroyer (1943) at Columbia, and Tampico (1944) at Fox.  At Paramount he was in Billy Wilder's Double Indemnity (1944) with Fred MacMurray and Barbara Stanwyck where his riveting soliloquy on insurance actuarial tables (written by Raymond Chandler) is considered a career showstopper,  and at Columbia he was in Mr. Winkle Goes to War (1944). He then performed with Joan Bennett and Dan Duryea in Fritz Lang's The Woman in the Window (1944) and Scarlet Street (1945) where he played a criminal painter.

At MGM he was in Our Vines Have Tender Grapes (1945), and then Orson Welles' The Stranger (1946), with Welles and Loretta Young.  Robinson followed it with another thriller, The Red House (1947), and starred in an adaptation of All My Sons (1948).

Robinson appeared for director John Huston as the gangster Johnny Rocco in Key Largo (1948), the last of five films which he made with Humphrey Bogart and the only one in which Bogart did not play a supporting role. Around the same time, he was cast in starring roles for Night Has a Thousand Eyes (1948) and House of Strangers (1949).

Greylisting
Robinson found it hard to get work after his greylisting.  He starred in modest-budget films: Actors and Sin (1952), Vice Squad (1953) with brief appearances by second-billed Paulette Goddard, Big Leaguer (1953) with Vera-Ellen, The Glass Web (1953) with John Forsythe, Black Tuesday (1954) with Peter Graves, The Violent Men (1955) with Glenn Ford and Barbara Stanwyck, the well-received Tight Spot (1955) with Ginger Rogers and Brian Keith, A Bullet for Joey (1955) with George Raft, Illegal (1955) with Nina Foch, and Hell on Frisco Bay (1956) with Alan Ladd.

His career's rehabilitation received a boost in 1954, when the anti-communist film director Cecil B. DeMille cast him as the traitorous Dathan in The Ten Commandments. The film was released in 1956, as was his psychological thriller Nightmare. After a subsequent short absence from the screen, Robinson's film career—augmented by an increasing number of television roles—restarted in 1958/59, when he was second-billed after Frank Sinatra in the 1959 release A Hole in the Head.

Supporting actor
Robinson went to Europe for Seven Thieves (1960). He had support roles in My Geisha (1962), Two Weeks in Another Town (1962), Sammy Going South (1963), The Prize (1963), Robin and the 7 Hoods (1964), Good Neighbor Sam (1964), Cheyenne Autumn (1964), and The Outrage (1964).

He was second-billed under Steve McQueen with his name above the title in The Cincinnati Kid (1965; McQueen had idolized Robinson while growing up and opted for him when Spencer Tracy insisted on top billing for the same role), and was top billed in The Blonde from Peking. He also appeared in Grand Slam (1967) starring Janet Leigh and Klaus Kinski.

Robinson was originally cast in the role of Dr. Zaius in Planet Of The Apes (1968) and he even went so far as to film a screen test with Charlton Heston. However, Robinson dropped out of the project before its production began due to heart problems and concerns over the long hours which he would have needed to spend under the heavy ape makeup. He was replaced by Maurice Evans.

His later appearances included The Biggest Bundle of Them All (1968) starring Robert Wagner and Raquel Welch, Never a Dull Moment (1968) with Dick Van Dyke, It's Your Move (1968), Mackenna's Gold (1969) starring Gregory Peck and Omar Sharif, and the Night Gallery episode “The Messiah on Mott Street" (1971).

The last scene which Robinson filmed was a euthanasia sequence, with his friend and co-star Charlton Heston, in the science fiction film Soylent Green (1973); he died 84 days later.

Heston, as president of the Screen Actors Guild, presented Robinson with its annual award in 1969, "in recognition of his pioneering work in organizing the union, his service during World War II, and his 'outstanding achievement in fostering the finest ideals of the acting profession.'"

Robinson was never nominated for an Academy Award, but in 1973 he was awarded an honorary Oscar in recognition that he had "achieved greatness as a player, a patron of the arts and a dedicated citizen ... in sum, a Renaissance man". He had been notified of the honor, but he died two months before the award ceremony took place, so the award was accepted by his widow, Jane Robinson.

Radio
From 1937 to 1942, Robinson starred as Steve Wilson, editor of the Illustrated Press, in the newspaper drama Big Town. He also portrayed hardboiled detective Sam Spade for a Lux Radio Theatre adaptation of The Maltese Falcon. During the 1940s he also performed on CBS Radio's "Cadena de las Américas" network broadcasts to South America in collaboration with Nelson Rockefeller's cultural diplomacy program at the U.S. State Department's Office of the Coordinator of Inter-American Affairs.

Political activism
During the 1930s, Robinson was an outspoken public critic of fascism and Nazism, donating more than $250,000 to 850 political and charitable organizations between 1939 and 1949. He was host to the Committee of 56 which gathered at his home on December 9, 1938, signing a "Declaration of Democratic Independence" which called for a boycott of all German-made products. After the Nazi invasion of the Soviet Union, while he was not a supporter of Communism, he appeared at Soviet war relief rallies in order to give moral aid to America's new ally, which he said could join "together in their hatred of Hitlerism".

Although he attempted to enlist in the military when the United States formally entered World War II, he was unable to do so because of his age; instead, the Office of War Information appointed him as a Special Representative based in London. From there, taking advantage of his multilingual skills, he delivered radio addresses in over six languages to European countries which had fallen under Nazi domination. His talent as a radio speaker in the U.S. had previously been recognized by the American Legion, which had given him an award for his "outstanding contribution to Americanism through his stirring patriotic appeals". Robinson was also an active member of the Hollywood Democratic Committee, serving on its executive board in 1944, during which time he became an "enthusiastic" campaigner for Roosevelt's reelection that same year. During the 1940s, Robinson also contributed to the cultural diplomacy initiatives of Roosevelt's Office of the Coordinator of Inter-American Affairs in support of Pan-Americanism through his broadcasts to South America on the CBS "Cadena da las Américas" radio network.

In early July 1944, less than a month after the Invasion of Normandy by Allied forces, Robinson traveled to Normandy to entertain the troops, becoming the first movie star to go there for the USO. He personally donated $100,000 ($1,500,000 in 2015 dollars) to the USO. After returning to the U.S., he continued his active involvement in the war effort by going to shipyards and defense plants in order to inspire workers, in addition to appearing at rallies in order to help sell war bonds.

After the war ended, Robinson publicly spoke out in support of democratic rights for all Americans, especially in demanding equality for Blacks in the workplace. He endorsed the Fair Employment Practices Commission's call to end workplace discrimination. Black leaders praised him as "one of the great friends of the Negro and a great advocator of Democracy". Robinson also campaigned for the civil rights of African Americans, helping many people to overcome segregation and discrimination.

During the years when Robinson spoke out against fascism and Nazism, he was not a supporter of Communism, but he did not criticize the Soviet Union, which he saw as an ally against Hitler. However, the film historian Steven J. Ross observes "activists who attacked Hitler without simultaneously attacking Stalin were vilified by conservative critics as either Communists, Communist dupes, or, at best, as naive liberal dupes." In addition, Robinson learned that 11 out of the more than 850 charities and groups which he had helped over the previous decade were listed as Communist front organizations by the FBI. As a result, he was called to testify in front of the House Un-American Activities Committee (HUAC) in 1950 and 1952 and he was also threatened with blacklisting.

As it appears in the full House Un-American Activities Committee transcript for April 30, 1952, Robinson "named names" of Communist sympathizers (Albert Maltz, Dalton Trumbo, John Howard Lawson, Frank Tuttle, and Sidney Buchman) and repudiated some of the organizations which he had belonged to in the 1930s and 1940s. He came to realize, "I was duped and used." His own name was cleared, but in the aftermath, his career noticeably suffered, because he was offered smaller roles and they were offered to him less frequently. In October 1952, he wrote an article titled "How the Reds made a Sucker Out of Me", and it was published in the American Legion Magazine. The chair of the committee, Francis E. Walter, told Robinson at the end of his testimonies that the Committee "never had any evidence presented to indicate that you were anything more than a very choice sucker."

Personal life

Robinson was married twice, first to stage actress Gladys Lloyd, born Gladys Lloyd Cassell, in 1927; she was the former wife of Ralph L. Vestervelt and the daughter of Clement C. Cassell, an architect, sculptor and artist. The couple had one son, Edward G. Robinson, Jr. (a.k.a. Manny Robinson, 1933–1974), as well as a daughter from Gladys Robinson's first marriage. In 1956, the couple divorced. In 1958, he married Jane Bodenheimer, a dress designer professionally known as Jane Arden. Thereafter he also maintained a home in Palm Springs, California.

In noticeable contrast to many of his onscreen characters, Robinson was a sensitive, soft-spoken and cultured man who spoke seven languages. Remaining a liberal Democrat, he attended the 1960 Democratic Convention in Los Angeles, California. He was a passionate art collector, eventually building up a significant private collection. In 1956, however, he was forced to sell his collection to pay for his divorce settlement with Gladys Robinson; his finances had also suffered due to underemployment in the early 1950s.

Death
Robinson died of bladder cancer at Cedars Sinai Hospital in Los Angeles on January 26, 1973. Services were held at Temple Israel in Los Angeles where Charlton Heston delivered the eulogy. Over 1,500 friends of Robinson attended with another 500 crowded outside. His body was then flown to New York where it was entombed in a crypt in the family mausoleum at Beth-El Cemetery in Brooklyn. Among his pallbearers were Jack L. Warner, Hal B. Wallis, Mervyn LeRoy, George Burns, Sam Jaffe, and Frank Sinatra.

In popular culture

In October 2000, Robinson's image was imprinted on a U.S. postage stamp, its sixth in its Legends of Hollywood series.

Robinson has been the inspiration for a number of animated television characters, usually caricatures of his most distinctive 'snarling gangster' guise. An early version of the gangster character Rocky, featured in the Bugs Bunny cartoon Racketeer Rabbit, shared his likeness. This version of the character also appears briefly in Justice League, in the episode "Comfort and Joy", as an alien with Robinson's face and non-human body, who hovers past the screen as a background character.

Similar caricatures also appeared in The Coo-Coo Nut Grove, Thugs with Dirty Mugs and Hush My Mouse.  Another character based on Robinson's tough-guy image was The Frog (Chauncey "Flat Face" Frog) from the cartoon series Courageous Cat and Minute Mouse. The voice of B.B. Eyes in The Dick Tracy Show was based on Robinson, with Mel Blanc and Jerry Hausner sharing voicing duties. The Wacky Races animated series character 'Clyde' from the Ant Hill Mob was based on Robinson's Little Caesar persona.

Voice actor Hank Azaria has noted that the voice of Simpsons character police chief Clancy Wiggum is an impression of Robinson. This has been explicitly joked about in episodes of the show. In "The Day the Violence Died" (1996), a character states that Chief Wiggum is clearly based on Robinson. In 2008's "Treehouse of Horror XIX", Wiggum and Robinson's ghosts each accuse the other of being rip-offs.

Another caricature of Robinson appears in two episodes of Star Wars: The Clone Wars season two, in the person of Lt. Tan Divo. Arok the Hutt was inspired by Edward G. Robinson's gangster portrayals in Star Wars: The Clone Wars

Robinson was played by Michael Stuhlbarg in the 2015 film Trumbo. His portrayal as a man who named supposed communists is controversial.

Selected filmography

 Arms and the Woman (1916) as Factory Worker (uncredited, some sources only)
 The Bright Shawl (credited as E.G. Robinson, 1923) as Domingo Escobar (with Richard Barthelmess, William Powell and Mary Astor) 
 The Hole in the Wall (1929) as The Fox (with Claudette Colbert)
 Outside the Law (1930) as Cobra Collins
 A Lady to Love (1930) as Tony 
 East Is West (1930) as Charlie Yong (with Lupe Vélez and Lew Ayres)
 Night Ride (1930) as Tony Garotta (with Joseph Schildkraut)
 Die Sehnsucht jeder Frau (1930) as Tony (German language version of A Lady to Love)
 The Kibitzer (1930, co-written original play only)
 An Intimate Dinner in Celebration of Warner Brothers Silver Jubilee (1930, short) as Himself
 The Widow from Chicago (1930) as Dominic (with Neil Hamilton)
 How I Play Golf by Bobby Jones No. 10: Trouble Shots (1931, short) as Himself (uncredited)
 Little Caesar (1931) as Little Caesar – Alias 'Rico' (with Douglas Fairbanks, Jr.) 
 The Stolen Jools (1931, short) as Gangster (segment "At the Police Station"; with Wallace Beery and Buster Keaton)
 Smart Money (1931) as Nick Venizelos (with James Cagney and Boris Karloff)
 Five Star Final (1931) as Randall (with Boris Karloff)
 The Hatchet Man (1932) as Wong Low Get (with Loretta Young)
 Two Seconds (1932) as John Allen 
 Tiger Shark (1932) as Mike Mascarenhas (with Richard Arlen)
 Silver Dollar (1932) as Yates Martin (with Bebe Daniels)
 The Little Giant (1933) as Bugs Ahearn (with Mary Astor)
 I Loved a Woman (1933) as John Mansfield Hayden (with Kay Francis)
 Dark Hazard (1934) as Jim 'Buck' Turner
 The Man with Two Faces (1934) as Damon Welles / Jules Chautard (with Mary Astor)
 The Whole Town's Talking (1935) as Arthur Ferguson Jones/"Killer" Mannion (with Jean Arthur)
 Barbary Coast (1935) as Luis Chamalis (with Miriam Hopkins, Joel McCrea, Walter Brennan, Brian Donlevy and David Niven)
 Bullets or Ballots (1936) as Detective Johnny Blake (with Joan Blondell and Humphrey Bogart) 
 Thunder in the City (1937) as Dan Armstrong (with Ralph Richardson)
 A Day at Santa Anita (1937, short) as Himself (uncredited)
 Kid Galahad (1937) as Nick Donati (with Bette Davis and Humphrey Bogart)
 The Last Gangster (1937) as Joe Krozac (with James Stewart)
 A Slight Case of Murder (1938) as Remy Marco
 The Amazing Dr. Clitterhouse (1938) as Dr. Clitterhouse (with Claire Trevor, Humphrey Bogart, Donald Crisp, Maxie Rosenbloom and Ward Bond)
 I Am the Law (1938) as Prof. John Lindsay
 Verdensberømtheder i København (1939, documentary) as Himself
 Confessions of a Nazi Spy (1939) as Edward Renard (with George Sanders, Paul Lukas and Ward Bond)
 Blackmail (1939) as John R. Ingram
 Dr. Ehrlich's Magic Bullet (1940) as Dr. Paul Ehrlich (with Ruth Gordon and Donald Crisp)
 Brother Orchid (1940) as 'Little' John T. Sarto (with Ann Sothern, Humphrey Bogart, Donald Crisp and Ralph Bellamy) 
 A Dispatch from Reuter's (1940) as Julius Reuter (with Eddie Albert)
 The Sea Wolf (1941) as 'Wolf' Larsen (with Ida Lupino, John Garfield and Barry Fitzgerald)
 Manpower (1941) as Hank McHenry  (with Marlene Dietrich, George Raft and Ward Bond)
 Polo with the Stars (1941, short) as Himself – Watching Polo Match (uncredited)
 Unholy Partners (1941) as Bruce Corey
 Larceny, Inc. (1942) as Pressure' Maxwell (with Jane Wyman, Broderick Crawford, Jack Carson, Anthony Quinn and Jackie Gleason)
 Tales of Manhattan (1942) as Avery L. 'Larry' Browne (with Charles Boyer, Rita Hayworth, Ginger Rogers, Henry Fonda and Charles Laughton) 
 Moscow Strikes Back (1942, documentary) as Narrator
 Magic Bullets (1943, short documentary) as Narrator
 Destroyer (1943) as Steve Boleslavski (with Glenn Ford)
 Flesh and Fantasy (1943) as Marshall Tyler (Episode 2) (with Charles Boyer and Barbara Stanwyck)
 Tampico (1944) as Capt. Bart Manson (with Victor McLaglen)
 Double Indemnity (1944) as Barton Keyes (with Fred MacMurray and Barbara Stanwyck)
 Mr. Winkle Goes to War (1944) as Wilbert Winkle
 The Woman in the Window (1944) as Professor Richard Wanley (with Joan Bennett and Raymond Massey)
 Our Vines Have Tender Grapes (1945) as Martinius Jacobson (with Agnes Moorehead)
 Journey Together (1945) as Dean McWilliams (with Richard Attenborough)
 Scarlet Street (1945) as Christopher Cross (with Joan Bennett)
 American Creed (1946, short) as Himself
 The Stranger (1946) as Mr. Wilson (with Loretta Young and Orson Welles)
 The Red House (1947) as Pete Morgan
 All My Sons (1948) (with Burt Lancaster) as Joe Keller
 Key Largo (1948) as Johnny Rocco (with Humphrey Bogart, Lauren Bacall, Lionel Barrymore and Claire Trevor)
 Night Has a Thousand Eyes (1948) as John Triton
 House of Strangers (1949) as Gino Monetti (with Susan Hayward and Efram Zimbalist, Jr.)
 It's a Great Feeling (1949) as Himself (uncredited) (with Doris Day and Jack Carson)
 Operation X (1950) as George Constantin
 Actors and Sin (1952) as Maurice Tillayou (segment "Actor's Blood")
 Vice Squad (1953) as Capt. 'Barnie' Barnaby (with Paulette Goddard)
 Big Leaguer (1953) as John B. 'Hans' Lobert (with Carl Hubbell)
 The Glass Web (1953) as Henry Hayes (with John Forsythe)
 Black Tuesday (1954) as Vincent Canelli (with Peter Graves)
 For the Defense (1954 TV movie) as Matthew Considine
 The Violent Men (1955) as Lew Wilkison (with Glenn Ford and Barbara Stanwyck)
 Tight Spot (1955) as Lloyd Hallett (with Ginger Rogers)
 A Bullet for Joey (1955) as Inspector Raoul Leduc (with George Raft)
 Illegal (1955) as Victor Scott (with Jayne Mansfield)
 Hell on Frisco Bay (1956) as Victor Amato (with Alan Ladd)
 Nightmare (1956) as Rene Bressard
 The Ten Commandments (1956) as Dathan (with Charlton Heston, Yul Brynner, Anne Baxter, John Derek and Vincent Price) 
 The Heart of Show Business (1957, short) as Narrator
 A Hole in the Head (1959) as Mario Manetta (with Frank Sinatra, Eleanor Parker and Thelma Ritter)
 Seven Thieves (1960) as Theo Wilkins (with Rod Steiger and Joan Collins)
 "The Devil and Daniel Webster" (1960, NBC-TV movie) as Daniel Webster
 The Right Man (1960, TV movie) as Theodore Roosevelt
 Pepe (1960) as Himself
 My Geisha (1962) as Sam Lewis (with Shirley MacLaine)
 Two Weeks in Another Town (1962) (with Kirk Douglas and Claire Trevor) as Maurice Kruger
 Sammy Going South (1963, a.k.a. A Boy Ten Feet Tall) as Cocky Wainwright
 The Prize (1963) as Dr. Max Stratman (with Paul Newman)
 Robin and the 7 Hoods (1964) as Big Jim Stevens (uncredited; with the Rat Pack and Bing Crosby)
 Good Neighbor Sam (1964) as Simon Nurdlinger (with Jack Lemmon and Neil Hamilton)
 Cheyenne Autumn (1964) as Secretary of the Interior Carl Schurz (with Richard Widmark, Karl Malden, Ricardo Montalbán and James Stewart)
 The Outrage (1964) as Con Man (with Paul Newman, Claire Bloom and William Shatner)
 Who Has Seen the Wind? (1965, TV movie) as Captain
 The Cincinnati Kid (1965) as Lancey Howard (with Steve McQueen, Ann-Margret, Karl Malden, Joan Blondell and Cab Calloway)
 Batman (1966) Cameo
 All About People (1967, short) as Narrator
 The Blonde from Peking (1967) as Douglas – chef C.I.A.
 Grand Slam (1967) as Prof. James Anders (with Janet Leigh)
 Operation St. Peter's (1967) as Joe Ventura
 The Biggest Bundle of Them All (1968) as Professor Samuels (with Robert Wagner and with Raquel Welch)
 Never a Dull Moment (1968) as Leo Joseph Smooth (with Dick Van Dyke)
 It's Your Move (1968) as Sir George McDowell
 Mackenna's Gold (1969) (with Gregory Peck) as Old Adams
 U.M.C., aka Operation Heartbeat (1969, TV movie) as Dr. Lee Forestman
 The Old Man Who Cried Wolf (1970, TV movie) as Emile Pulska (with Martin Balsam and Ed Asner)
 Song of Norway (1970) as Krogstad (with Florence Henderson)
 Mooch Goes to Hollywood (1971) as Himself – Party guest (uncredited)
 Night Gallery (1971) Season 2, episode 13a ("The Messiah on Mott Street") as Abe Goldman
 Rowan & Martin's Laugh-In (1971) Cameo
 Neither by Day Nor by Night (1972) as Father
 Soylent Green (1973) as Sol Roth (with Charlton Heston and Joseph Cotten; Robinson's final film role)

Radio appearances

See also 
 List of posthumous Academy Award winners and nominees

References

Further reading

External links

 
 
 
 
 Photographs and literature

1893 births
1973 deaths
20th-century American male actors
Academy Honorary Award recipients
Activists for African-American civil rights
American Academy of Dramatic Arts alumni
American anti-fascists
American male film actors
American male silent film actors
American male stage actors
American people of Romanian-Jewish descent
Burials in New York (state)
California Democrats
Cannes Film Festival Award for Best Actor winners
City College of New York alumni
Deaths from bladder cancer
Deaths from cancer in California
Hollywood blacklist
Jewish American activists
Jewish American art collectors
Jewish American male actors
Jewish anti-fascists
Jewish anti-racism activists
Male actors from Bucharest
Male actors from New York City
Male actors from Palm Springs, California
New York (state) Democrats
People from the Lower East Side
People of the United States Office of War Information
Romanian Ashkenazi Jews
Romanian emigrants to the United States
Screen Actors Guild Life Achievement Award
Townsend Harris High School alumni
United States Navy personnel of World War I
Warner Bros. contract players
Yiddish theatre performers
20th-century American Jews
Members of The Lambs Club
American Ashkenazi Jews
Yiddish-speaking people